Pedro Salgado Collett Solberg (born 27 March 1986) is a Brazilian male beach volleyball player.

Solberg's mother, Isabel Salgado, herself was a successful beach volleyball player and won in 1994 a FIVB World Tour event in Miami. His sisters Maria Clara Salgado and Carolina Solberg Salgado are also beach volleyball players and they play since 2005.

Career
Solberg won with three different partners the U18 World Championship in 2002 and U21 in 2003 and 2006 in beach volleyball. In 2006 he started with Roberto Lopes at several FIVB World Tour tournaments with a fourth place as best result. In the following two years Pedro Solberg arrived with his new partner Harley Marques nine tournament victories, which were won the 2008 FIVB World Tour and voted "Team of the Year".

In 2009 season Solberg played with different partners. He started with his first partner in an FIVB World Tour tournament Pedro Cunha where he won two silver medals and with Benjamin Insfran won the Polish Open in Stare Jabłonki. Two fourth places with Ricardo Santos marked the end of the year.

2010
After a fifth place with Santos in the Brasília Open, he decided to have another collaboration with Marques, his partner in the successful 2007 and 2008 years. They won the next tournament in the Shanghai, however, demonstrated in the following events, the only other place in front of the field, a fifth place at the Grand Slam in Moscow. After two ninth places in Stavanger and Gstaad, a seventeenth place in Klagenfurt and another fifth place in Stare Jablonki, Solberg/Marques won the silver medal in Kristiansand. They defeated their compatriots including Insfran/Bruno Oscar Schmidt and Emanuel Rego/Alison Cerutti and lost the final against the Americans Todd Rogers/Phil Dalhausser. At the end of the season reached Solberg/Marques still ninth place in Åland and The Hague.

2011
In the first four events of the year, Solberg began playing with Cunha, best finish was a fourth place in Prague. With his new partner Rhooney Ferramenta reached fifth place in the fifth event of the season, including the World Championships in Rome. In Stavanger, the two Brazilians ranked in the 25th place, they were ninth in Gstaad. Solberg was then removed because of a doping suspicion. He was lift provisionally the suspension in mid-August because of a delay in the testing that was not the fault of the athlete. In October, the International Volleyball Federation closed the doping charges after concluding that "there is no evidence of an anti-doping rule violation". In Agadir, Morocco, he won the bronze medal with Ferramenta in the final event of the season.

References

External links
 

1986 births
Living people
Beach volleyball blockers
Brazilian men's beach volleyball players
Volleyball players from Rio de Janeiro (city)
Olympic beach volleyball players of Brazil
Beach volleyball players at the 2016 Summer Olympics
21st-century Brazilian people